Beverley Ussher (born Melbourne 1868; died Melbourne, 9 June 1908) was articled to Melbourne architect Alfred Dunn. Dunn was English and had worked for architect Alexander Lauder in Barnstaple, Devon, where he worked with Arts and Crafts movement theorist and practitioner W.R. Lethaby. Through Dunn's English connections, when Ussher completed his architecture articles in Melbourne, he visited England and was introduced to architect Walter Butler. Later Ussher and Butler formed a partnership in Melbourne.

Ussher's first architectural partner, Walter Richmond Butler (1864–1949), was an English architect who worked in London as chief assistant to ecclesiastical architect J. D. Sedding.  Butler was accepted into the Arts and Crafts and Domestic Revival circles centred on William Morris and Richard Norman Shaw, among whom his closest friend was Ernest Gimson (1864–1919).

In June 1888 Butler left Sedding's office and sailed for Australia, perhaps at the prompting of young architect Beverley Ussher then visiting London. Three of Butler's brothers and one of his sisters also settled in Australia. From 1889 until 1893 Butler was in partnership with Ussher. In 1896 they were joined by George C. Inskip but they parted in 1905 after a dispute with the Royal Victorian Institute of Architects over the conduct of a competition.

Beverley Ussher and Henry (Hardie) Kemp (born Broughton, Lancashire, UK, 10 March 1859; died Melbourne, 22 April 1946) then formed a partnership in Melbourne in 1899, which lasted until Ussher's death (1908). This "brilliant partnership" pioneered the Australian Federation style of domestic architecture. Both Ussher and Kemp had strong Arts and Crafts commitments, and both had been in partnerships before forming their own.

The practice specialised in domestic work and their houses epitomise the Marseilles-tiled Queen Anne (or Federation style) houses characteristic of Melbourne, and considered now to be a truly distinctive Australian genre.
At the time of their creation they were a break with the use of cement render, applied stucco ornament, cast iron, slates, and double hung windows.
Their designs use red bricks, terracotta tiles and casement windows, avoid applied ornamentation and develop substantial timber details. The picturesque character of the houses results from a conscious attempt to express externally with gables, dormers, bays, roof axes, and chimneys, the functional variety of rooms within.

The iconic Federation style houses by Beverley Ussher and Henry Kemp did not appear until 1892–4. Then, several of those appeared in Boroondara.
Dalswraith for William Gibson, 99 Studley Park Road, Kew (1906) and a house for A. Norman, 7 Adeney Avenue, Kew (1908) are superb examples of his designs.

"George Tibbits has discussed this firm at great length in his article "The so-called Melbourne Domestic Queen Anne". It was undoubtably one of the most accomplished and prolific of the Melbourne practices of the early twentieth century. It drew on a distinguished line of work by the individual partners from the nineteenth century."

Ussher & Butler 
Butler and Ussher worked together on a series of designs between 1890 and 1893, many of which are  considered to be outstanding examples of the Picturesque Aesthetic.

George Tibbits, in an article titled 'The So-Called Melbourne Domestic Queen Anne' describes Blackwood Homestead as being 'one of the finest 19th century examples' of this type.

Ussher in solo practice 
Beverley Ussher designed the house 'Milliara' (John Whiting house) in Wallace Avenue. Toorak, in about 1895. It seemed very anglophile in that it had a drawing room ceiling which exactly reproduced the dining hall ceiling at Bolsover Castle, which Ussher had himself measured and drawn. However the architraves of the arches were decorated with local flora, and the panelling used Australian timbers.

Two years later the emphasis on local timber was even greater in Ussher's house for J C Foden in Canterbury: "The whole of the woodwork of the drawing room, dining room, hall, stairs and landing, including the sliding doors, was carried out in Australian and New Zealand woods, such as silky oak, blackwood, fiddleback and kauri, and then French polished."

Ussher & Kemp
Houses
Ussher & Kemp are said to have been responsible for nearly every impressive Federation Queen Anne style house in the eastern suburbs of Kew, Hawthorn and Camberwell.

Ussher's work falls into two categories:
 
Gabled designs, usually large two-storey houses where gables project from an overall hipped roof. In general, Ussher's largest houses (such as Dalwraith in Kew of 1906), adopt the gabled form.

Single storey designs, the large, spreading multi-gabled form that developed into the distinctive Queen Anne style the dominant house style in the first decade of the twentieth century. Seminal examples by Assher & Kemp include the Hedges House in Canterbury and the Clarke house in Toorak, both of 1897.

Together Ussher & Kemp developed this style with, characteristically featuring tall Marseilles tiled hipped roofs, timber verandah decorations, and a strongly three-dimensional form with emphasis.

The Queen Anne style combined with some of the principles of Australian homestead planning and design around the turn of the century, to produce a new suburban style continuing to the end of World War One and is sometimes loosely referred to as Edwardian or Federation.

Queen Anne style had an ongoing influence on vernacular design which can be seen up to the 1960s.

The domestic Queen Anne style buildings which survive from the turn of the century had a vital role in the development of the urban form of metropolis."

 Arden 1045 Burke Rd Hawthorn East, VIC, (1906)
Architecturally significant for: its adaptation of Queen Anne style to a tight site; the complexity of its elevation and planning; the use of the unusual splayed corner on a Queen Anne style design; and for the outstanding fence, rare on Queen Anne-style houses throughout Metropolitan Melbourne. Arden was demolished in 2017 after a long battle through VCAT and the Supreme Court, replaced by a visually disjointed, ordinary block of apartments which were judged by VCAT to be a better public outcome than Arden. 
 Avondale 22 Berkeley St Hawthorn, VIC, Australia.  Built during Hawthorn's period of Edwardian prosperity for grocer, Benjamin Ratcliffe, this substantial brick residence was rated first in 1903–04 as a brick house of eleven rooms, unfinished, Net Annual Value 90 pounds. The previous year, the site had been vacant land. The valuation went up to 100 pounds in 1907, when the property of eleven rooms was known as Avondale and occupied still by the Ratcliffe family. 
 Carramah, 31 Canterbury Road, Camberwell, Vic 3124
"A magnificent landmark residence"
Built Circa 1909 for Herbert Parsons a spice trader and set on a magnificent allotment (2,089sqm) with superbly landscaped and maintained gardens, this landmark residence showcases the elegance and graciousness of classic Ussher & Kemp architecture, whilst providing unparalleled family living and entertaining areas both inside and outside.
 Coorinyah House 150 Mont Albert Road Canterbury (1899)
Architects Ussher & Kemp acted for Mellor when the house was connected to the MMBW sewer, in 1907, and it appears that they were also the designers.
At Coorinyah, the broad hipped roof is the dominant backdrop for a number of gabled roof forms, chimneys and the unusual shingle-spired look-out, with its attached chimney. Below the eaves line giant arched timber supports spring between gabled verandah or room bays, almost removing the visual support for the large roof expanses above it.
 Cottage by the Sea orphanage at Queenscliff (1892)
Beverly Ussher's seminal Cottage by the Sea orphanage at Queenscliff (now demolished), set out the mature Federation villa form: see The Building and Engineering Journal, 8, 184, 9 January 1892, p. 14,
 Cupples house, now Travancore, at 104 (now 608) 608 Riversdale Road CAMBERWELL (1899)
A perfect example of a gracious residence standing on a cul-de-sac corner showcasing lavish architectural allure.
 Dalswraith 99 Studley Park Road, Kew, (1906) (A-graded)
RAIA 20th CENTURY BUILDINGS REGISTER (later Campion Hall)
 Dalvui Homestead Terang (1908)
Dalvui at 4310 Mackinnons Bridge Road. Noorat 3265 is a widely admired property, with its famed gardens and grand home.
 Davies House 5 Wilismere Road Kew 1903
RAIA 20th CENTURY BUILDINGS REGISTER
 Eildon, 34 Thompson Street Hamilton, Victoria (1904)
Eildon, now known as the Napier Club, was built as a two-storey, red brick residence and surgery for Dr David Laidlaw in 1904 to a design by architects Ussher and Kemp in the Federation Queen Anne style.
 The Gables, 15 Finch Street, East Malvern (1902–03)
 Halsey house, (also known as Wee Nestie) 69 Broadway, CAMBERWELL, 3124, (1900–1) 
Wee Nestie is placed askew on its owner site, it is aligned, unlike its neighbours, neither perpendicularly nor diagonally to the street. A large indented gateway was at a comer splay in the allotment and an asphalt tennis court on the west of the house.
Architects, Ussher & Kemp, designed this nine-room Queen Anne styled house for importer, William Halsey in 1900. G. Garrett was the builder. Later owners included J.R Wood and P.R Kershaw; the latter converting, Wee Nestie to Karinyah private hospital in 1959.
 House, 27 Balwyn Road Camberwell
 Hedges house at 20 Knutsford Street, Balwyn c.1895
 House, 98 Riversdale Road HAWTHORN (1889)
Architecturally significant at the State level as one of Ussher and Kemps' best and most sophisticated designs, integrating unusual brick detailing and an atypical symmetrical arrangement.
The architects Ussher and Kemp designed the imposing Edwardian villa at 98 Riversdale Road in 1899 for George and Mary Ann Thyssen.
 House and Surgery, 169 Canterbury Road, Canterbury
169 Canterbury Road is one of the more prominent designs by the renowned residential partnership of Ussher and Kemp at a time when the practice was at its peak. It compares directly – and favourably – with other leading designs of theirs, particularly among their two-storey houses, and is a direct predecessor to Kemp's renowned Dalswraith in Kew.
 Kurue 114 Bellair St Kensington, VIC, Australia
external image 114%2520Bellair%2520St%2520Kensington%252C%2520VIC.jpg
Architecturally, a near original prominent and early example of a common suburban style, designed by the Queen Anne Villa specialists Ussher and Kemp: of metropolitan importance. Historically, for a long period one of the few sources of medical attention in the local community: of local importance.
 Norman House, 7 Adeney Avenue, Kew (1908)
Built between 1901 and 1910 to the designs of architects Ussher and Kemp, the Norman House is a fine example of the hip roofed genre of the so-called Melbourne Queen Anne style house and one of the most representative works emanating from Melbourne's most renowned firm of residential architects at the time of Federation.
 Kurue 114 Bellair St Kensington, VIC, Australia
Architecturally, a near original prominent and early example of a common suburban style, designed by the Queen Anne Villa specialists Ussher and Kemp: of metropolitan importance. Historically, for a long period one of the few sources of medical attention in the local community: of local importance.
 Marlborough House 8–10 Back Beach Rd Portsea, VIC, Australia
An essentially intact well-designed and detailed example of the Federation style, Marlborough House was constructed in local materials. It exhibits the regional motif of tuck-pointed red brick quoins to a limestone building. Important architectural features such as the timber verandah with original posts, balustrade fretwork, brackets and floor, twin gable ends with infill strapwork, limestone brackets and intact joinery remain. It is of interest that the symmetry of the composition relied on the construction of the ballroom wing. This implies an optimism regarding the success of the project when it first started.
 Residence 1093 Burke Rd Hawthorn East, VIC, Australia
Amongst the best examples of Queen Anne style villas in Hawthorn, substantially intact and illustrating particularly well, the strong garden orientation of the style. Illustrative of the high quality for houses constructed on Hawthorn's major boulevards.
 Residence 178 Barkers Rd Hawthorn, VIC, Australia
A typical example of the smaller scale bungalow adaptation of the Queen Anne style which became synonymous with the garden suburb ideal in the Edwardian period. A smaller work by Ussher and Kemp but illustrating the transfer of stone arcading to timber verandah form, which was influential in the popular market.
 Seward House 2 Studley Avenue KEW 3101
"Grand in stature and glorious in detail, standing amidst elevated grounds (21,500 sqft) in prestigious Studley Park, 'Seward House' c1899 is one of celebrated architects' Ussher & Kemp's first commissions that set a magnificent precedent for a distinguished partnership. A rare offering on an expansive 1,998sqm allotment.
 Travancore, 608 Riversdale Rd Camberwell (1899)
This magnificent Federation Queen Anne residence is Ussher & Kemp at their glorious best masterfully merging with stunning contemporary enhancement.

Other works
The Professional Chambers building in Collins Street was designed for the Trustees of the Independent Church by Beverley Ussher of the firm Ussher and Kemp. The building was finished in 1908, the year Ussher died.

The three-storey red brick structure with attic is styled in a mode eclectically derived from Romanesque Revival, Gothic Revival, Elizabethan Revival and Queen Anne Revival architecture.

The construction is of tuck-pointed face red brick decorated with rendered cement dressings and a terra cotta tile roof. The Picturesque roof line with steep gable ends and tall clustered chimneys, the oriel windows and central round arch Romanesque entry with foliated decoration together produces a bold facade to Collins Street.

The design reflects Ussher's preoccupation with the Picturesque domestic revival in Victoria and has links with the so-called Queen Anne Revival style in England.

Gallery
Plea:"These pictures are indicative, please help to upload pictures of the houses listed above."

See also
 Australian architectural styles
 Arts and Crafts Movement
 Federation architecture
 Queen Anne style

References

External links
 Federation-House wiki: Ussher and Kemp
 Vol 3 Intro – Camberwell – City of Boroondara
 Cottage by the Sea Commemorative Keepsake

1868 births
1908 deaths
Architectural history
Architects from Melbourne